

Teams
Two clubs relegated at the end of the previous season were Rabotnički and Mačva. Teams promoted to the 1952–53 Yugoslav First League were Velež and Spartak.

League table

Results

Winning squad
Champions:
RED STAR BELGRADE (coach:  Bane Sekulić, replaced by Žarko Mihajlović)

players (league matches/league goals):
Miljan Zeković (22/0)
Todor Živanović (21/17)
Branko Stanković (21/1)
Predrag Đajić (21/1)
Siniša Zlatković (21/0)
Rajko Mitić (18/8)
Tihomir Ognjanov (17/3)
Milorad Diskić (17/0)
Branislav Vukosavljević (13/8)
Kosta Tomašević (9/3)
Dimitrije Tadić (7/0)
Jovan Cokić (6/2)
Bela Palfi (6/1)
Vasilije Šijaković (6/1)
Ljuba Spajić (6/0)
Dragoljub Župac (3/0)
Milivoje Đurđević (2/0)
Branko Nešović (1/0)
Svetislav Milić (1/0)
Miodrag Petrović (1/0)
Miroslav Lazić (1/0)

Top scorers

See also
1952–53 Yugoslav Second League
1952 Yugoslav Cup

External links
Yugoslavia Domestic Football Full Tables

Yugoslav First League seasons
Yugo
1